The James Rumsey Technical Institute (JRTI) is a technical institute in Martinsburg, West Virginia. It is named after James Rumsey, an American mechanical engineer and inventor from Shepherdstown, West Virginia. JRTI was founded on March 25, 1969.

Accreditation 
James Rumsey Technical Institute is accredited by the Council on Occupational Education.

External links
Official website

References 

Education in West Virginia
Education in Berkeley County, West Virginia
Public high schools in West Virginia
Martinsburg, West Virginia